Tout un monde lointain... (A whole distant world...) is a concertante work for cello and orchestra composed by Henri Dutilleux between 1967 and 1970 for Mstislav Rostropovich. It is considered one of the most important 20th-century additions to the cello repertoire and several major cellists have recorded it. Despite the fact that the score does not state that it is a cello concerto, Tout un monde lointain... has always been considered as such.

Each of the five movements was inspired by the poetry of Charles Baudelaire, and the overall feel of the work is mysterious and oneiric. A typical performance runs approximately 27 minutes.

Composition

The work was initially commissioned by Igor Markevitch for the Concerts Lamoureux and Mstislav Rostropovich around 1960. Occupied with other projects, Dutilleux only completed the concerto in 1970. Since Markevitch had left the Concerts Lamoureux in 1961, Rostropovich was accompanied for the premiere by the Orchestre de Paris, conducted by Serge Baudo, at the Festival d'Aix-en-Provence (25 July 1970). The cello part was edited by the Russian cellist and published with his fingerings.

Instrumentation

In addition to the solo cello part, the concerto is scored for two flutes, piccolo, two oboes, two clarinets, bass clarinet, two bassoons, contrabassoon, three horns, two trumpets, two trombones, tuba, celesta, harp, timpani, percussion (bongos, tom-toms, snare drum, bass drum, crotales, triangle, suspended cymbals, cymbals, gongs, tam-tams, xylophone, marimba, and glockenspiel), and strings.

Form

The piece has five movements, each bearing a title and a quotation from a poem from Les fleurs du mal, by Charles Baudelaire. Dutilleux began to work on Baudelaire's poetry on Roland Petit's advice.

The title of the score itself is a quotation from the poem La chevelure: "Tout un monde lointain, absent, presque défunt" (A whole distant world, absent, almost defunct) which is included in Les fleurs du mal. Moreover, each movement is prefaced by a quotation from Baudelaire.

There is no break or pause between the movements.

Description

Discography
 Mstislav Rostropovich (cello), Orchestre de Paris, Serge Baudo (cond.). Recorded November 5–6, 1974 (Salle Wagram, Paris). EMI Records.
 Arto Noras (cello), Finnish Radio Symphony Orchestra, Jukka-Pekka Saraste (cond.). Recorded 1992. Finlandia Records.
 Lynn Harrell (cello), Orchestre National de France, Charles Dutoit (cond.). Recorded 1995. Decca Records.
 Boris Pergamenschikow (cello), BBC Philharmonic, Yan Pascal Tortelier (cond.). Recorded February 4–5, 1997 (Manchester). Chandos Records.
 Truls Mørk (cello), Orchestre Philharmonique de Radio France, Myung-Whun Chung (cond.). Recorded July 17–19, 2001 (Maison de Radio France, Paris). EMI Records/Virgin Classics.
 Jean-Guihen Queyras (cello), Orchestre National Bordeaux Aquitaine, Hans Graf (cond.). Recorded 2002. Arte Nova Classics.
 Marc Coppey (cello), Orchestre Philharmonique de Liège, Pascal Rophé (cond.). Recorded July 12–15, 2007. Aeon Records.
 Christian Poltéra (cello), Vienna Radio Symphony Orchestra, Jac van Steen (cond.). Recorded November, 2008 (RadioKulturhaus, Vienna, Austria). Bis Records.
 Anssi Karttunen (cello), Orchestre Philharmonique de Radio France, Esa Pekka Salonen (cond.). Recorded in 2012. Deutsche Grammophon.
 Xavier Phillips (cello), Seattle Symphony, Ludovic Morlot (cond.). Recorded in 2013. Seattle Symphony Media.
 Emmanuelle Bertrand (cello), Luzerner Sinfonieorchester, James Gaffigan (cond.). Recorded in 2015. Harmonia Mundi France.
 Johannes Moser (cello), Rundfunk-Sinfonieorchester Berlin, Thomas Søndergård (cond.). Recorded in 2018. Pentatone Records.

References

External links
 12–13 April 2012 programme, Chicago Symphony Orchestra
 Cello and piano version, Boosey & Hawkes
 , Nicolas Altstaedt (cello)

Compositions by Henri Dutilleux
1970 compositions
Dutilleux
Commissioned music
Les Fleurs du mal in popular culture